Denbury Inc. is a company engaged in hydrocarbon exploration. It is organized in Delaware and headquartered in Plano, Texas.

The company extracts petroleum via enhanced oil recovery (tertiary recovery), which utilizes carbon dioxide to extract petroleum from fields that have been previously exploited. The company's operations are focused in the Gulf Coast and Rocky Mountain regions. As of December 31, 2021, Denbury had  of estimated proved reserves, of which 98.6% was petroleum and 1.4% was natural gas. The company also has an estimated 910 billion cubic feet of probable carbon dioxide reserves at Jackson Dome. The company's largest producing property is the Cedar Creek Anticline in Montana and North Dakota, which accounted for 23% of production in 2021.

History
In March 1951, the company was incorporated in Manitoba as "Kay Lake Mines Limited (N.P.L.)".

In September 1984, the name of the company was changed to "Newscope Resources Limited".

In December 1985, the name of the company was changed to "Denbury Resources Inc."

In May 1997, the company became a public company via an initial public offering.

In 1998, the company acquired properties from Chevron Corporation for $202 million.

In August 1999, the company began its enhanced oil recovery operations with the acquisition of the Little Creek Field.

In 2001, the company acquired Matrix Oil & Gas for $138 million in cash and stock. The company also acquired the Jackson Dome carbon dioxide reserves and the NEJD Pipeline in Mississippi, providing a source of carbon dioxide and the related transportation infrastructure.

In 2009, the company sold its assets in the Barnett Shale.

In 2010, the company acquired Encore Acquisition Company in a $4.6 billion transaction.

In 2012, the company acquired Thompson Field in Fort Bend County, Texas for $360 million. The company also sold its acreage in the Bakken Formation to ExxonMobil for $1.6 billion.

In 2013, the company acquired fields in the Cedar Creek Anticline from ConocoPhillips for $1.05 billion.

In 2017, Christian S. Kendall was named chief executive officer of the company. The company also acquired assets in the Salt Creek Field of Wyoming from Linn Energy for $71.5 million.

In July 2020, the company filed bankruptcy. It emerged from bankruptcy in September 2020 and changed its name to Denbury Inc.

References

External links

1997 initial public offerings
Companies based in Plano, Texas
Companies established in 2003
Companies listed on the New York Stock Exchange
Natural gas companies of the United States
Oil companies of the United States
Companies that filed for Chapter 11 bankruptcy in 2020